The 1990 San Jose mayoral election was held to elect the mayor of San Jose, California. It saw an initial election held on June 5, 1990, followed by a runoff election on November 3, 1990 after no candidate managed to obtain a majority in the initial election. The runoff was won by Susan Hammer.

Incumbent mayor Tom McEnery was term limited.

Candidates
Advanced to runoff
Frank Fiscalini, former CEO of Alexian Brothers Hospital and former superintendent of the East Side Union High School District
Susan Hammer, San Jose city councilor

Eliminated in first round
William Chew
Louis Garza
Don Houston, realtor
Shirley Lewis, San Jose city councilor
Chris P. Panopulos, founder of the City of San Jose Fund

Results

General election

Runoff

References

San Jose
San Jose
1990